LateRooms.com is a hotel reservations website providing discounted accommodation throughout the UK, Europe and the rest of the world.

Company history
LateRooms.com was launched in Salford, Greater Manchester, in 1999 by brothers Steven, Paul, Tony Walsh and Chris Allen The site originally started as a simple directory listing hotels, but in 2002 moved to enable users to book hotels online (some hotels require a telephone booking through LateRooms.com). In December 2006, the company was bought by First Choice Holidays plc in a deal worth between £108 million and £120 million.
September 2007 saw First Choice Holidays plc merge with TUI Travel plc to form the TUI Travel Group.

In 2010 LateRooms.com moved to a new head office at The Peninsula building in Manchester, along with sister companies AsiaRooms.com and Hotels-London.co.uk.

In May 2015 TUI announced a restructure of all of its brands and that Laterooms would be sold off.

In October 2015, Cox & Kings acquired LateRooms.com for £8.5 million (approx Rs. 85 crore) However, in March 2016, it sold 100% of LateRooms Ltd (UK) ('LateRooms') to Enterprises UK Ltd. ('Malvern') for GBP 20 million.

On 1 August 2019 LateRooms.com announced they had ceased trading via Twitter and a message on their website. The brand was purchased by the Snaptrip Group and the website and social media have subsequently came back online.

References

External links
 

Companies based in Manchester
British travel websites
Internet properties established in 1999
1999 establishments in the United Kingdom
Hotel and leisure companies of the United Kingdom